Dumbéa is a commune in the suburbs of Nouméa in the South Province of New Caledonia, an overseas territory of France in the Pacific Ocean. The population of the commune was 35,873 according to the 2019 census.

From 1904 to 1940 the town was linked to Nouméa by the Nouméa-Païta railway.

Population

Twin towns – sister cities

Dumbéa is twinned with:

 Fréjus, France (1985)
 Lifou, New Caledonia (2000)
 Port Vila, Vanuatu (2003)
 Poum, New Caledonia (2014)
 Punaauia, French Polynesia (1991)

References

External links

  

Communes of New Caledonia